The Flute Reed River is a  stream in northeastern Minnesota, United States, flowing into Lake Superior at the village of Hovland.

Early in author Calvin Rutstrum's life he lived in a cabin on the Flute Reed river.

See also
List of rivers of Minnesota

References

Minnesota Watersheds
USGS Hydrologic Unit Map - State of Minnesota (1974)

Rivers of Minnesota
Tributaries of Lake Superior
Rivers of Cook County, Minnesota
Northern Minnesota trout streams